Penguin Island Lighthouse was a lighthouse located on Penguin Island at the north end of Rivoli Bay in South Australia.

It was first lit on 1 October 1878.  In 1960, the lighthouse was decommissioned to allow the transfer of the light's apparatus to a new lighthouse on Cape Martin to the immediate north. In 1904, John Hendry, head keeper of the lighthouse, was lost at sea and presumed drowned.

See also

 List of lighthouses in Australia

References

External links
 Australian Maritime Safety Authority

Lighthouses completed in 1878
Lighthouses in South Australia
Limestone Coast
Disused lighthouses in Australia